The Jabalpur–Amravati Express is a Superfast Express train of Indian Railways, which runs between Jabalpur Junction railway station of Jabalpur, the major tourist city of Central Indian state, Madhya Pradesh and  railway station of Maharashtra, India. The train is India's 10th ISO Certified train. Train runs daily with high speed and secure LHB coach.

Coach composition
The train consists of 22 coaches:

 1 AC I Tier
 2 AC II Tier
 6 AC III Tier
 7 Sleeper coaches
 4 Unreserved
 2 EOG/Power Car/Generator Car

Average speed and frequency
The train runs with an average speed of 51 km/h. The train runs on daily basis from both the sites.

Loco link
The train is hauled by Itarsi & Tuglakabad-based WAP-7 with HOG connected from Jabalpur Junction to Amravati Terminal.

Rake maintenance
The train is maintained by the Jabalpur Coaching Depot.

See also
Mahakoshal Express
Indore Junction
Bhopal Junction

References

Express trains in India
Railway services introduced in 2011
Rail transport in Madhya Pradesh
Rail transport in Maharashtra
Transport in Amravati
Transport in Jabalpur